Mike Curcio (born January 24, 1957) is a former American football linebacker in the National Football League (NFL).

Biography
Curcio was born on January 24, 1957, in Hudson, New York.

Career
Curcio was drafted in the eighth round of the 1980 NFL Draft by the Philadelphia Eagles and would later play two seasons with the team. During the 1983 NFL season, he played with the Green Bay Packers.

He played at the collegiate level at Temple University.

See also
List of Philadelphia Eagles players
List of Green Bay Packers players

References

People from Hudson, New York
Philadelphia Eagles players
Green Bay Packers players
American football linebackers
Temple Owls football players
1957 births
Living people
Players of American football from New York (state)